The Franklin Prophecy, sometimes called the Franklin Forgery, is an antisemitic speech falsely attributed to Benjamin Franklin, warning of the supposed dangers of admitting Jews to the nascent United States. The speech was purportedly transcribed by Charles Cotesworth Pinckney during the Constitutional Convention of 1787, but was unknown before its appearance in 1934 in the pages of William Dudley Pelley's Silver Legion pro-Nazi magazine Liberation. No evidence exists for the document's authenticity, and some of Pelley's claims have actively been disproven.

Speech 
The setting for the speech is a dinner table discussion purportedly recorded by Pinckney during the convention of the Continental Congress. Primarily, it is a polemic arguing against permitting Jewish immigration into the newly formed United States. The text is as follows:

Lack of authenticity 
According to Pelley, Pinckney wrote that he had kept a journal of the Convention. This journal has never been found, and no evidence exists for Pelley's claim that it was printed privately. The Franklin Institute has rejected Pelley's claims that it owns a manuscript copy of the speech.

The U.S. Congress report Anti-Semitism in Europe: Hearing Before the Subcommittee on European Affairs of the Committee on Foreign Relations (2004) states: 
The Franklin "Prophecy" is a classic anti-Semitic canard that falsely claims that American statesman Benjamin Franklin made anti-Jewish statements during the Constitutional Convention of 1787. It has found widening acceptance in Muslim and Arab media, where it has been used to criticize Israel and Jews...

Franklin was a friend to the Jews of 18th-century America, and contributed toward the building of Philadelphia's first permanent synagogue. The Anti-Defamation League noted that the reference to the civilized world giving Palestine back to the Jews was an anachronism, since the modern Zionist movement did not arise until nearly a century after Franklin's death.  

Similar antisemitic quotations have been attributed to George Washington and have been disproven. In 1790, in a marked sign of religious tolerance, Washington sent a letter to the Jewish community in Rhode Island, writing "May the Children of the Stock of Abraham, who dwell in this land, continue to merit and enjoy the good will of the other Inhabitants; while every one shall sit under his own vine and fig tree, and there shall be none to make him afraid."

Usage 
Despite having been repeatedly discredited since its first appearance, the "Prophecy" has proved a remarkably durable antisemitic canard. It has appeared most recently as a popular Internet hoax promulgated on Usenet groups and antisemitic websites, where it is presented as authentic. On February 18, 1998, a member of the Fatah Central Committee revived this myth, while mistakenly referring to Franklin as a former President of the United States. Osama bin Laden used this canard briefly in his October 2002 "Letter to the American People."

See also 

 Andinia Plan
 Antisemitic canard
 Blood libel
 Cultural Bolshevism
 Cultural Marxism conspiracy theory
 Doctors' plot
 Dreyfus affair
 The Eternal Jew (art exhibition)
 The Eternal Jew (book)
 The Eternal Jew (film)
 The Foundations of the Nineteenth Century
 The International Jew
 Jewish Bolshevism
 Jewish question
 Judeo-Masonic conspiracy theory
 Kosher tax conspiracy theory
 The Protocols of the Elders of Zion
 Reich Ministry of Public Enlightenment and Propaganda
 Rootless cosmopolitan
 Stab-in-the-back myth
 Well poisoning
 Zionist Occupation Government conspiracy theory
 Żydokomuna

References

Further reading
 Afsai, Shai. "Benjamin Franklin and Judaism." Journal of the American Revolution. November 17, 2016.
 Afsai, Shai. "How Ben Franklin Was Turned Into an Antisemite." JewThink. March 8, 2021.
 Allen, Henry Butler. "Franklin and the Jews." The Franklin Institute News. Vol. III, No. 4, August 1938, pp. 1–2.
 Beard, Charles A. "Exposing the Anti-Semitic Forgery about Franklin." Jewish Frontier. New York, March 1935, pp. 1–13.
 Boller, Paul F., and John George. They Never Said It: A Book of Fake Quotes, Misquotes, and Misleading Attributions. New York: Oxford University Press, 1989.
 Boyd, Julian P. "Society News and Accessions." Pennsylvania Magazine of History and Biography. Vol. 61. April, 1937, pp. 233–234.
 Huang, Nian-Sheng. Benjamin Franklin in American Thought and Culture, 1790–1990. Philadelphia: American Philosophical Society, 1994, pp. 174–180.
 Kominsky, Morris. The Hoaxers: Plain Liars, Fancy Liars, and Damned Liars. Boston: Branden Press, 1970.
 Lopez, Claude-Anne. "Prophet and Loss." The New Republic. January 7, 1997.
 Pelley, William Dudley, ed. "Did Benjamin Franklin Say this about the Hebrews?" Liberation. Vol. 5, No. 24. February 3, 1934.
 Seligman, Scott. "Franklin Prophecy." Tablet. August 4, 2021.

External links
"Benjamin Franklin vindicated : an exposure of the Franklin 'prophecy'". American Jewish Congress, 1938, New York City.
Beard, Charles A. "Charles A. Beard exposes anti-Semitic forgery about Benjamin Franklin". League for Labor Palestine, 1935, New York City.

1930s hoaxes
Antisemitic forgeries
Benjamin Franklin
Hoaxes in the United States
Internet hoaxes
Political forgery
Pseudohistory
1934 documents
Antisemitism in the United States
Literary forgeries